Aethria is a genus of moth in the subfamily Arctiinae.

Species
 Aethria analis Schaus, 1910
 Aethria felderi Rothschild, 1911
 Aethria haemorrhoidalis Stoll, 1790
 Aethria hampsoni Dognin, 1902
 Aethria melanobasis Druce, 1897
 Aethria ornata Ménétriés, 1857
 Aethria paula Schaus, 1894
 Aethria pyroproctis Hampson, 1914
 Aethria splendens Jörgensen, 1935

References

 Natural History Museum Lepidoptera generic names catalog

Arctiinae
Moth genera